Evergestis nolentis is a moth in the family Crambidae. It was described by Carl Heinrich in 1940. It is found in North America, where it has been recorded from California.

References

Evergestis
Moths described in 1940
Moths of North America